SWFU may refer to:

Service & Food Workers Union Nga Ringa Tota (SFWU) is a trade union in New Zealand
Seychelles Federation of Workers' Unions (SFWU) is a national trade union center in Seychelles
Southwest Forestry University, in Kunming, Yunnan, China
Star Wars: The Force Unleashed, video game published by LucasArts